Timothy Meaher (1812 3 March 1892) was a wealthy Irish-American human trafficker, businessman and landowner.  He built and owned the slave-ship Clotilda and was responsible for illegally smuggling the last enslaved Africans into the United States in 1860.

Slave trade
The illegal purchasing and transporting of slaves was made as a bet to see if Meaher could avoid the 1807 Act Prohibiting Importation of Slaves. Meaher reportedly described the bet as "a thousand dollars that inside two years I myself can bring a shipful of niggers right into Mobile Bay under the officers' noses." Meaher sold some of the slaves but took the rest to work for his brother James and himself. Meaher had its captain, William Foster (1825–1901), burn and scuttle Clotilda in Mobile Bay, attempting to destroy evidence of their joint lawbreaking. The wreck was located in 2019. 

The slaves were freed in 1865, but Timothy Meaher refused to help them return home or provide reparations. He sold them some land where they created the slave colony of Africatown. The United States government attempted to charge Meaher, but due to factors such as difficulty proving the crime and the Civil War, he was never prosecuted. However in 1890, two years before his death, Meaher bragged in a newspaper interview about his slave trading.

Death and legacy
Timothy Meaher died on 3 March 1892 in Mobile, Alabama. He is buried at the Catholic Cemetery in Toulminville, Alabama.
The Meaher family is still prominent in Alabama, with Meaher State Park bearing the name, as well as a Meaher Avenue running through Africatown. The family has refused to make any statement "about their sinister ancestor’s crime" or release his personal papers. Some of the family members composed a letter with a public statement in October 2022 expressing disapproval of their ancestor's action.

References

Further reading
 

1812 births
1892 deaths
19th-century American businesspeople
American gangsters of Irish descent
American people of Irish descent
American slave owners
American slave traders
Businesspeople from Alabama
Businesspeople from Maine
History of slavery in Alabama
Human trafficking in the United States
Irish-American history
People from Mobile, Alabama
People from Lincoln County, Maine
Post-1808 importation of slaves to the United States